The 2006 World Judo Juniors Championships was an edition of the World Judo Juniors Championships, organised by the International Judo Federation. It was held in Santo Domingo, Dominican Republic from 12 to 15 October 2006.

Medal summary

Men's events

Women's events

Source Results

Medal table

References

External links
 

World Judo Junior Championships
World Championships, U21
Judo
Judo competitions in the Dominican Republic
Judo
Judo, World Championships U21